Sandra-Helena Ribeiro Tavares Homo (born May 29, 1982) is a Portuguese pole vaulter. Tavares represented Portugal at the 2008 Summer Olympics in Beijing, where she competed for the women's pole vault. She successfully cleared a height of 4.30 metres, finishing nineteenth overall in the qualifying rounds, and tying her position with Greece's Afroditi Skafida, and Poland's Joanna Piwowarska.

Her two sisters, Maria Leonor Tavares and Elisabete Tavares Ansel also competed in the pole vault.

Competition record

References

External links

NBC 2008 Olympics profile

Portuguese female pole vaulters
Living people
Olympic athletes of Portugal
Athletes (track and field) at the 2008 Summer Olympics
1982 births
Portuguese people of Cape Verdean descent
Competitors at the 2003 Summer Universiade
Competitors at the 2005 Summer Universiade
Competitors at the 2007 Summer Universiade